The Pastýřská stěna, also Ovčí stěna (German: Schäferwand, English: Shepherd's Wall), is a sandstone rock massif on the shores of the River Elbe in the borough of Děčín (Tetschen) in the Czech Republic.

History 
According to language researchers, the name goes back to the German Schiefe Wand which means "inclined wall". The present Czech name is a translation of its German name, Schäferwand.

As early as the 19th century the Schäferwand (it was then Austrian) was a popular tourist destination due to its striking appearance. As a result it was decided to build a wooden refuge hut that, in 1905, was replaced by a solid wooden building in the shape of a romantic castle, and which still stands on the Schäferwand today. From the terrace of the restaurant there is a picturesque view of the Elbe valley and Děčín Castle opposite.

After 1945 the zoo from Děčín was moved to the plateau. Within the rock a lift was built from the Elbe road to the hill plateau, which is currently out of service (as at 2006).

A tunnel on the Dresden–Děčín railway runs through the rock.

For hikers a red signposted trail runs from the station at Děčín to the summit and continues to the Hoher Schneeberg.

Gallery

Elbe Sandstone Mountains
Rock formations of the Czech Republic
Mountains and hills of Bohemian Switzerland